San Javier (San Francisco Xavier de los Piñocas or San Xavier) is the seat of San Javier Municipality in Ñuflo de Chávez Province, Santa Cruz Department, Bolivia. The mission of San Javier is known as part of the Jesuit Missions of the Chiquitos, declared in 1990 a World Heritage Site, as a former Jesuit Reduction.

History
In 1691, the mission of San Francisco Xavier was founded by Jesuit missionary José de Arce. The mission hosted the Piñoca Indians. In 1696, due to the incursion of Paulistas from Brazil, the mission was relocated to the San Miguel River. It was relocated again in 1698, this time closer to Santa Cruz, due to another Paulista incursion. In 1708, Spanish from Santa Cruz captured many Indians, and the mission had to be relocated away from Santa Cruz.

Languages
The Piñoco dialect of Chiquitano, now extinct, was spoken in San Javier.

Today, Camba Spanish, which has many words from Piñoco, is spoken in San Javier.

See also
 List of Jesuit sites
 List of the Jesuit Missions of Chiquitos

References

External links

 
 Map of Ñuflo de Chávez Province
 San Javier: Description of Jesuit mission with pictures and information

Populated places in Santa Cruz Department (Bolivia)
Buildings and structures in Santa Cruz Department (Bolivia)
World Heritage Sites in Bolivia
Tourist attractions in Santa Cruz Department (Bolivia)
Churches in Bolivia
Jesuit Missions of Chiquitos